The International Association of Paediatric Dentistry (IAPD) is a non-profit organization.

Council and voting
The Council of the IAPD consists of one voting Delegate representing each National Member Society. A National Member Society may nominate one alternate delegate who can attend the Council Meeting and who will only vote if the Delegate is absent. All voting delegates to Council must hold current Individual Membership in IAPD. The Council holds full power to pursue the objectives of the Association. Council meetings are held at least once every two years during the International Congress and hosted by one of the members of the council in their locale.

Over the last decade, meetings were held as follows: 2021 online, 2019 Cancun, 2017 Santiago, 2015 Glasgow, 2013 Seoul, 2011 Athens, 2009 Munich.

The Board of Directors has an international representation and a two-year appointment. For example, the board members for 2021-2023 are from Peru (President), Brazil (Immediate Past President), Turkey (President Elect), Israel (Secretary General), USA (Editor) South Africa, India and South Korea (Representatives for National Member Societies).

There are ten IAPD Standing Committees set up by the board of directors and approved by the council. These committees have a very important role as advisory bodies to the board of directors; their recommendations may be partially or fully taken into account by the Board for decision making on various IAPD matters.

The Committees are: 
 Executive Committee
 Education Committee
 Finance Committee
 Congress Site Selection and Coordination Committee
 Constitution Review Committee
 Membership Committee
 Awards Committee
 Nominations Committee
 Public Relations Committee
 Science Committee

Activities
In addition to the Council Meetings held every two years, the association hosts regional meetings as well as educational workshops and E-Learning programs.
Since the year 2000 the association has developed outreach programs. Dentists for All Children (DENFAC) was launched in 2001. The project introduces teachers of dental students to contemporary knowledge, techniques, and standards by providing a series of lectures and clinical teaching sessions. of assistance. Programs for Africa and Asia include Teach the Teachers Educational Workshop.

The IAPD promotes Events from IAPD National Member Societies as well as those from other related organizations. Examples of related organizations includes: The Italian Society of Paediatric Dentistry, The Paedodontic Society of South Africa, The FDI World Dental Congress, The Asociación Argentina de Odontología para Niños (AAON), The Hellenic Society of Pediatric Dentistry.

The IAPD promotes global dialogue with regard to Paediatric Dentistry. In 2019, in a global effort to define children's early childhood carries, The Bangkok declaration was accepted. 

The IAPD publications include a yearly newsletter and journal, International Journal of Paediatric Dentistry, published six times a year. A website is updated with events, online training videos and eLearning opportunities.

Membership 
The IAPD differentiates between member nations and individuals. In addition there are National Member Societies, Individual members, Honorary Members, Senior Members, IAPD Supported Members, post‐graduate Student Members and Affiliate Members. The IAPD's goal is for membership to be inclusive of all societies and individuals and members are encouraged to attend Congresses.

References

External links
 

Organizations established in 1969
Organisations, Dental
Health care-related professional associations
Organizations

Children's health-related organizations
Pediatric organizations